Revolution is the third studio album by American country music singer Miranda Lambert. It was released on September 29, 2009 via Columbia Records Nashville. The album includes the singles "Dead Flowers", "White Liar," "The House That Built Me," "Only Prettier" and "Heart Like Mine," all of which have charted on the U.S. Billboard Hot Country Songs chart.

Revolution won the Album of the Year award at the Academy of Country Music Awards and at the Country Music Association Awards in 2010.

Content
Lambert began working on Revolution in February 2009. She wrote or co-wrote all but four of the album's 15 tracks. The album includes co-writes with her ex-husband, then boyfriend, Blake Shelton, who also provides background vocals on "Maintain the Pain", and former Columbia Records artist Ashley Monroe. Charles Kelley and Dave Haywood of Lady Antebellum co-wrote "Love Song," on which they also sing background vocals. The album also includes covers of Fred Eaglesmith's "Time to Get a Gun" and John Prine's "That's the Way the World Goes 'Round".

To help promote the album, an EP titled Dead Flowers was released on September 8, 2009.

The album's lead single, "Dead Flowers", was released in May 2009 following Lambert's performance on the 44th Annual Academy of Country Music Awards. The song reached a peak of number 37 in July 2009 after spending sixteen weeks on the U.S. Billboard Hot Country Songs chart. "White Liar" was released as the album's second single in August 2009. In November 2009, Lambert performed "White Liar" on the 2009 CMA Awards; following this performance, the single became her first Top 40 hit on the U.S. Billboard Hot 100, jumping from number 66 to number 38. It reached a peak of number 2 in February 2010 on the U.S. country chart. "The House That Built Me," the third single, was released in March 2010. It became Lambert's fastest-rising single to date, and became her first Number One hit for the week of June 12, 2010, on the U.S. Billboard Hot Country Songs chart, staying at number 1 for 4 consecutive weeks. "Only Prettier" was released as the fourth single on July 26, 2010, and debuted at number 45 for the week of July 17, 2010. It reached a peak of number 12 in December 2010. The fifth and final release, "Heart Like Mine", was released on January 10, 2011.

On September 24, 2009, Lambert performed all the tracks on Revolution in sequence at the Ryman Auditorium, five days before the album's scheduled release date.

Promotion
In promotion for Revolution, Lambert made appearances on Good Morning America, Late Show with David Letterman, and The Ellen DeGeneres Show throughout the first week of the album's release. Additionally, she was featured on the cover story of Country Weekly magazine; she also made appearances in several other magazines, including Rolling Stone and US Weekly.

Lambert began her first headlining tour in support of Revolution. The Roadside Bars & Pink Guitars tour kicked off in March 2010 and included at least 22 stops, including a performance at the Bonnaroo Music Festival.

Critical reception

Upon its release, Revolution received universal acclaim from most music critics. At Metacritic, which assigns a normalized rating out of 100 to reviews from mainstream critics, the album received an average score of 85, based on 11 reviews, which indicates "universal acclaim".

Rolling Stone magazine praised the album saying, "Lambert remains country's most refreshing act, and not just because she makes firearms seem like a matter-of-fact female accessory." Entertainment Weekly magazine said, "She's found stylistic shades of songwriters twice her age..." and that the album is "...a portrait of an artist in full possession of her powers, and the best mainstream-country album so far this year." The Boston Globe commented that “Revolution’’ is the sound of Miranda Lambert coming into her own." Slant Magazine also had high praises reserved for the album saying, "Miranda Lambert expands on her fascinating, fully realized artistic persona on Revolution."

The song "The House That Built Me" was ranked number 1 on Engine 145's Best Country Songs of 2009. Two additional songs from Revolution also made the list; "White Liar" at number 11 and "Only Prettier" at number 37.

Commercial performance
Revolution debuted at number 1 on the U.S. Billboard Top Country Albums chart, her third consecutive Number One album on the chart. It also debuted at number 8 on the U.S. Billboard 200. The album sold approximately 66,000 copies in the first week of release, her highest first week total to date. In February 2010, Revolution was certified Gold, and in October 2010 the album was certified Platinum by the RIAA. As of  2016, the album has sold 1,790,000  copies in the US.

Awards and nominations

Track listing

Personnel
Credits adapted from album's liner notes.

Vocals
Miranda Lambert – lead vocals
Natalie Hemby – background vocals
Kim Keyes – background vocals
Mike Wrucke – background vocals
Charles Kelley of Lady Antebellum – guest vocalist (on "Love Song")
Buddy Miller – guest vocalist  (on "Somewhere Trouble Don't Go")
Ashley Monroe – guest vocalist  (on "Me and Your Cigarettes")
Randy Scruggs – guest vocalist  (on "That's the Way That the World Goes 'Round")
Blake Shelton – guest vocalist  (on "Maintain the Pain")
Chris Stapleton of The Steeldrivers – guest vocalist  (on "Time to Get a Gun")

Musicians
Chad Cromwell – drums
Fred Eltringham – drums
Glenn Worf – bass
Richard Bennett – guitar
Jim Hoke – Guitar, utility
Jay Joyce – guitar
Randy Scruggs – guitar
Mike Wrucke – banjo, acoustic guitar, mandolin, electric guitar, keyboards, B-3 organ
Chuck Leavell – B-3 Organ
Eric Darken – percussion
Greg Leisz – steel guitar
Russ Pahl – steel guitar

Production
Mike Wrucke – engineering, mixing, producer
Eric Tonkin – assistant engineering, mixing assistant
Mark Petaccia – assistant engineering
Oran Thornton – assistant engineering, mixing assistant
Stephen Marcussen – mastering
Stewart Whitmore – digital editing
Brittany Hamlin – production coordination
Frank Liddell – producer

Design
Randee St. Nicholas – photography
Tracy Baskette-Fleaner – creative director, design
Judy Forde-Blair – creative producer, liner notes
Tammie Harris Cleek – imaging, photo production
Enzo Angileri – hair stylist
Mylah Morales – make-up
David Thomas – stylist

Business
Lisa Ramsey-Perkins – A&R

Charts

Weekly charts

Singles

Year-end charts

Certifications

References

2009 albums
Miranda Lambert albums
Columbia Records albums
Albums produced by Frank Liddell